The Egyptian Federation for Scouts and Girl Guides (EFSGG,  Al-Ittiḥād al-`Ām lil-Kaššāfah wal-Muršidāt) is the national Scouting and Guiding federation of Egypt. Scouting was founded in 1914 and was among the charter members of the World Organization of the Scout Movement in 1922, while nominally independent from Britain. Guiding started in 1913 and became a member of the World Association of Girl Guides and Girl Scouts in 1931. The EFSGG serves 79,611 Scouts (as of 2011) and 92,000 Guides (as of 2003).

History

The first Scout group was founded in Alexandria, brought to Egypt by the British during their occupation. 

Mohamed Ali Hafez served on the World Scout Committee of the World Organization of the Scout Movement from 1957 to 1963 and again from 1965 to 1971.

In 1965, Hafez was awarded the Bronze Wolf, the only distinction of the World Organization of the Scout Movement, awarded by the World Scout Committee for exceptional services to world Scouting. Other recipients include Aziz Osman Bakir in 1971, John M. Lioufis in 1978, and Gamal Khashaba in 1982.

Structure and program
Most Scout troops are associated with schools, clubs, mosques and churches. Rover units are associated with high schools and universities. Egyptian Scouts play an important role in community service. They are involved in projects of desert reclamation, work camps, blood drives, medical care and other projects.

Scouts are offered vocational training and the skills needed to help develop communities. Scouts learn the importance of planting trees where firewood is scarce, building energy efficient stoves and making good use of their skills of carpentry, electricity and plumbing. 

The EFSGG has four central associations:
 Boy Scouts
 Sea Scouts
 Air Scouts
 Girl Guides - Gamiet Morshidat Gomhoriet Misr al Arabiah
Each of these central associations has a correspondent regional association in the 26 governorates of Egypt; a coordination committee in each governorate organizes the activities and the cooperation between the associations.

The Girl Guides association has three age divisions:
 Brownies
 Girl Guides
 Rovers

The Cairo International Scout Center is a lavish six-floor building next to Cairo International Stadium that welcomes all Scouts, nonScout organizations and individual guests. The home of the Arab Scout Region, it hosts both conference areas and hostel quarters. In addition, Egypt has a national Scout center, El-Seleen.

The Scout Motto is Kun Musta'idan or كن مستعداً, translating as Be Prepared in Arabic. The noun for a single Scout is Kashaf or كشاف in Arabic.

The Scout emblem incorporates elements of each of the four central associations, as well as a lotus.

Emblems

International Scouting units in Egypt 

In addition, there are American Boy Scouts in Cairo and Alexandria, linked to the Direct Service branch of the Boy Scouts of America, which supports units around the world. There are also Greek Scouts of the Soma Hellinon Proskopon in Alexandria.

References

External links 
 Official Homepage
 Homepage of the Girl Guides

World Association of Girl Guides and Girl Scouts member organizations
World Organization of the Scout Movement member organizations
Scouting and Guiding in Egypt